Didier Van Cauwelaert (born 29 July 1960) is a French author of Belgian descent who was born in Nice. In 1994 his novel Un Aller simple won the Prix Goncourt.

In 1997 he was awarded the Grand prix du théâtre de l’Académie française.

Works 
 Vingt ans et des poussières (1982)
 Poisson d'amour (1984)
 Les vacances du fantôme (1986)
 L'orange amère (1988)
 Un objet en souffrance (1991)
 Cheyenne (1993)
 Un aller simple (1994) / One-Way (2003)
 La vie interdite (1997)
 Corps étranger (1998)
 La demi-pensionnaire (1999)
 L'éducation d'une fée (2000)
 L'Apparition (2001)
 Rencontre sous X (2002)
 Amour (2002)
 Hors de moi / Out of My Head (2003), used as the basis for the 2011 motion picture Unknown.
 L'évangile de Jimmy (2004)
 Attirances (2005)
 Cloner le Christ ? (2005)
 Le père adopté (2007)
 La nuit dernière au XVe siècle (2008)
 Les témoins de la mariée (2010)
 Le journal intime d'un arbre (2011)
 La femme de nos vies (2013)
 Le Principe de Pauline (2014)
 Jules (2015)
 On dirait nous (2016)
 Le Retour de Jules (2017)
 J'ai perdu Albert (2018)
 La personne de confiance (2019)
 L'inconnue du 17 mars (2020)
 Le pouvoir des animaux (2021)

Filmography
 1992: My Wife's Girlfriends
 2018: J'ai perdu Albert

External links

  Official site
 
 

Living people
1960 births
20th-century French novelists
21st-century French novelists
People from Nice
Prix Goncourt winners
French people of Belgian descent
French male novelists
Roger Nimier Prize winners
20th-century French male writers
21st-century French male writers